Yvonne Weldon  (born 9 February 1971) is an Australian local government politician. She was elected deputy chairwoman of Metropolitan Local Aboriginal Land Council and was the first Aboriginal candidate for Lord Mayor of the City of Sydney in the 2021 NSW local governments election. She is the first Aboriginal councillor elected in the City of Sydney.

Early life and background
Weldon is of Wiradjuri ancestry. From a young age, she developed a strong passion and commitment to bringing about positive change for Aboriginal people and communities.  She attended public school in Redfern, Sydney.
Weldon is currently the Deputy Chair of the Metropolitan Local Aboriginal Land Council, Deputy Chair of the New South Wales Australia Day Council, a board member of Domestic Violence NSW and a former board member of Redfern Jarjum College. She has spent more than 20 years working in key First Nations and government organisations across the country.

In 2016, she was short-listed for the Queensland Literary Awards, David Unaipon Award for her unpublished manuscript 67 Days and was awarded the 2017 Allen & Unwin Faber Writing Academy scholarship. Sixty-Seven Days was published by Michael Joseph in 2022. Sydney Morning Herald reviewer, Juliette Hughes, claimed the book was more than a romance and that it "should be on every book club’s list". 

Weldon conducted the welcome to country ceremony for Australia Day 2019 at Sydney harbourside with the then New South Wales Premier Gladys Berejiklian and Governor David Hurley.

Awards

Weldon was awarded the 2019 NSW Volunteer of the Year for the South Sydney Region and she was awarded the 2022 Cancer Institute NSW Aboriginal Woman of the Year Award. She was appointed a Member of the Order of Australia in the 2022 Queen's Birthday Honours for her work with the Indigenous community of New South Wales.

References

External links 

1971 births
Living people
Australian indigenous rights activists
Women human rights activists
People from Cowra
Wiradjuri people
Members of the Order of Australia